Hladaw (sometimes Hladaw Model Village) is a crossroads village in Wetlet Township of Shwebo District in the Sagaing Region of Burma (Myanmar).  It is located on the plains between the Mu River and the Irrawaddy. Hladaw is at the cross roads of the Shwebo–Sagaing road and the Wetlet–Monywa road.  Access to the railroad is via Wetlet.

Further reading
 Khin Myo Chit, Daw (1995) Gift of Laughter Parami Books, Rangoon, Burma,  (on the picturesque speech of the people of Hladaw, selections of which have been published in the Pyinsa Rupa Magazine.)

Notes

External links
"Hladaw Map — Satellite Images of Hladaw" Maplandia

Populated places in Sagaing Region